The following lists include the incidents that occurred in the territory of the present-day Czech Republic in which the killing of more than five non-combatant people (unarmed civilians, prisoners, or prisoners of war) took place.

Massacres before the Hussite Wars (up until the year 1419) 
The following is a list of massacres and antisemitic pogroms that occurred in the territory of the present-day Czech Republic before the year 1419:

Massacres during the Hussite Wars (1419 to 1436) 
The following massacres and antisemitic pogroms occurred in the territory of the present-day Czech Republic during the Hussite Wars of 1419–1436. During these wars, many atrocities were committed by both Hussites and Catholics. Most Hussites were ethnic Czechs, but there were also German and Polish adherents of this movement. On the other side, most Catholics involved in this conflict were ethnic Germans, but Hungarian, Czech, and Polish Catholics were also killed during the fights and massacres. Jews who sided with the reformer Jan Hus were also victimized during this period. Many killings of the Hussite Wars took place outside the borders of today's Czech Republic; they are not included here.

Massacres between 1436 and 1900 
The following is a list of massacres and pogroms that occurred in the territory of the present-day Czech Republic between the years 1436 and 1900:

Massacres between 1900 and 1939 
The following is a list of massacres and pogroms that occurred in the territory of the present-day Czech Republic during the 20th century, but before World War II:

Massacres during World War II 
The following is a list of massacres and pogroms that occurred in the territory of the present-day Czech Republic in the time of Nazi Occupation of Czechoslovakia, until the end of World War II on May 8, 1945. The only exception is the biggest single-day mass murder of Czech citizens in history, which was committed at the Theresienstadt family camp at Auschwitz II-Birkenau in modern-day Poland, on March 8–9, 1944. There were also single-day mass murders of Czech citizens in the Nazi concentration camps outside the Czech lands, such as in Maly Trostenets, 28 August 1942 (999 killed); Riga, 28 August 1942 (1001 killed); Mauthausen, 24 October 1942 (262 killed); Mauthausen, 10 April 1945 (235 killed) etc. If not stated otherwise, the victims were of Czech ethnicity.

Massacres after World War II up until Communist Takeover on February 25, 1948 
The following is a list of massacres that occurred in the territory of the present-day Czech Republic between May 9, 1945 and February 25, 1948 (the day of the communist takeover):

Massacres during the Time of Communist Rule (1948–1989) 
The following is a list of massacres that occurred in the territory of the present-day Czech Republic between 1948 and 1989:

Massacres after 1989

References

See also
List of massacres in Slovakia

Czech Republic
Massacres

Massacres
Antisemitism in the Czech Republic
The Holocaust in Bohemia and Moravia